Cat Vs. Rat is a 1982 Shaw Brothers martial arts-comedy film directed by Lau Kar Leung, starring Alexander Fu, Adam Cheng, Kara Hui, and Hsiao Ho. The plot is loosely based on the 19th century wuxia classic novel The Seven Heroes and Five Gallants.

Plot
Baak Juktong and Zin Ciu were martial arts students of the same sifu, Si Daatfu. They quarreled and fought incessantly over who had the most powerful kungfu. Baak saved the emperor, traveling in the region in plain clothes, but did not believe his identity when the emperor offered him officialdom. Later, Zin also saved the emperor, who appointed him imperial sword-bearing guard with the title "Royal Cat". Jealous and infuriated, especially because his nickname was "Brocade-Coated Rat" (rats were known as cat food), Baak and his four sworn brothers — Zoeng Ping the "River-Overturning Rat", Ceoi Hing the "Mountain-Boring Rat", Hon Zoeng the "Earth-Piercing Rat" and Lou Fong the "Sky-Penetrating Rat" — plotted to steal the imperial jade seal from the emperor to embarrass Zin.

Cast
 Note: The characters' names are in Cantonese (Jyutping) romanisation. Mandarin (Pinyin) romanisation is included in parentheses when helpful.
Kara Hui as Zin Juklaan
Hsiao Ho as Zoeng Ping (Jiang Ping)
Alexander Fu Sheng as Baak Juktong (Bai Yutang)
Adam Cheng as Zin Ciu (Zhan Zhao)
Lau Kar-wing as Si Daatfu
Lydia Shum as Baak's mother
Gordon Liu as the emperor
Lam Fai-wong as Can Gim
Johnny Wang Lung-wei as Ceoi Hing (Xu Qing)
Ching Chu as Hon Zoeng (Han Zhang)
David Cheung Chin-pang as Lou Fong (Lu Fang)

References

External links

 Cat Vs. Rat at hkcinemagic.com

 CAT VS. RAT at rottentomatoes.com

1982 films
1980s Cantonese-language films
Kung fu films
Hong Kong martial arts films
Shaw Brothers Studio films
Films based on The Seven Heroes and Five Gallants
1980s Hong Kong films